The Ecofly M160 is a German aircraft engine, adapted by Otto Funk from a Smart Car engine and produced by Ecofly of Böhl-Iggelheim for use in ultralight aircraft.

Design and development
Funk adapted the engine starting in 2001, with the cooperation of Daimler Chrysler. Mercedes-Benz and its Smart Car division provided assistance with adapting the engine control unit. The initial installation was in a flying school B&F Fk9 and this later resulted in a production model of the Fk9, called the Fk9 Smart.

The engine is a three-cylinder, in-line, turbocharged, four-stroke,  displacement, liquid-cooled, automotive conversion gasoline engine design, with a toothed poly V belt reduction drive. It produces  at 5600 rpm, with a compression ratio of 9.5:1.

Applications
B&F Fk9

Specifications (M160)

See also

References

External links

Official engine manual

Ecofly aircraft engines
Liquid-cooled aircraft piston engines
2000s aircraft piston engines